Yony Alexander González Copete (born 11 July 1994) is a Colombian professional footballer who plays for Portimonense.

Career

Fluminense
On 27 December 2018 Gonzalez signed with Fluminense as his contract with Atlético Junior was about expire. On 8 January 2019 he was officially presented by Fluminense.

Benfica
On 10 January 2020, González signed with the Portuguese club Benfica on a contract that extends until 2024. He terminated his contract with the club by mutual agreement on 31 January 2023.

LA Galaxy (loan)
On 19 August 2020, González was loaned to MLS side LA Galaxy for the remainder of their 2020 season.

Ceará (loan) 
On 23 February 2021, González returned to Brazil on a loan deal until December 2021, to play in Série A club Ceará.

Deportivo Cali (loan) 
On 6 February 2022, was loaned to Categoría Primera A side Deportivo Cali for the remainder of their 2022 season.

Portimonense
On 1 February 2023, González joined Portimonense on a contract until the end of the season with an option for an additional year.

Career statistics

Club

References

External links

1994 births
Living people
Footballers from Medellín
Colombian footballers
Association football midfielders
Envigado F.C. players
Atlético Junior footballers
Fluminense FC players
S.L. Benfica footballers
Sport Club Corinthians Paulista players
LA Galaxy players
Ceará Sporting Club players
Deportivo Cali footballers
Portimonense S.C. players
Categoría Primera A players
Campeonato Brasileiro Série A players
Major League Soccer players
Primeira Liga players
Colombian expatriate footballers
Expatriate footballers in Brazil
Expatriate footballers in Portugal
Expatriate soccer players in the United States
Colombian expatriate sportspeople in Brazil
Colombian expatriate sportspeople in Portugal
Colombian expatriate sportspeople in the United States